The following is a list of notable events and releases of the year 2014 in Swedish music.

Events

January

February
 1 – The Melodifestivalen first semi-final took place. The three next semi-finals was executed on February 8, 15, and 22.

March
 1 – The Melodifestivalen second chance took place on March 1.
 8 – Final of the Melodifestivalen was on March 8, 2014. Sanna Nielsen's song "Undo (Sanna Nielsen song)" won the competition.

April
 28 – Swedes Max Martin, Ilya Salmanzadeh and Shellback produced "Problem" by Ariana Grande and Iggy Azalea.

May
 9 – Gamlestaden Jazzfestival started in Göteborg (May 9 – 10).

June
 26 – The 2nd Bråvalla Festival opened near Norrköping (June 26 - 28).

July
 5 – Ghost (Swedish band) performed at the European Sonisphere Festival at Knebworth Park, Knebworth, England.

August

September

October

November

December

Album and singles releases

January

February
 4 – Years by Markku Ounaskari / Kari Heinilä / Lena Willemark / Anders Jormin (Eclipse Records).

March
 3 – Truth Serum EP by Tove Lo, her album released on March 3. The album speaks about a love and personal story.
 7 – Behind The Sun by Motorpsycho with Reine Fiske (Rune Grammofon).
 12 – Kent released La Belle Epoque on March 12.
 28 – Momento Magico by guitarist Ulf Wakenius (ACT Music).
 31 – My Silver Lining single by First Aid Kit, a folk-pop song.

April
 30 – Tigerdrottningen, the eleventh studio album by Kent, was released on April 30.

May
 13 – Hail the Apocalypse by the band Avatar is scheduled for release.

June
 10 – Stay Gold the third album by First Aid Kit was released in the United States.

July

August

September

October

November

December

Unknown date
#

G – Hidros6 Knockin'  by Mats Gustafsson & NU Ensemble (Not Two Records).

Deaths

 February
 11 – Alice Babs, Swedish singer and actress (born 1924).

 July
 24 – Christian Falk, record producer and musician (born 1962).

 October
 11 – Mats Rondin, cellist and conductor (born 1960).

See also
Sweden in the Eurovision Song Contest 2014
List of number-one singles and albums in Sweden (see 2014 section on page)

References

 
Swedish music by year
Swedish
Music